Herbert Wimble Gay (January 25, 1909 – May 1979) was an American baseball pitcher in the Negro leagues. The brother of fellow Negro leaguer Willie Gay, Gay played with the Chicago American Giants in 1929 and the Birmingham Black Barons and Baltimore Black Sox in 1930.

References

External links
 and Baseball-Reference Black Baseball stats and Seamheads

Baltimore Black Sox players
Birmingham Black Barons players
Chicago American Giants players
1909 births
1979 deaths
Baseball players from Georgia (U.S. state)
Baseball pitchers
20th-century African-American sportspeople